The 100th edition of the Gran Piemonte one-day cycling classic race , also known as the Giro del Piemonte, was held on 20 September 2016, one day after Milano–Torino and two days before Il Lombardia, as part of the Trittico di Autunno. Italian Giacomo Nizzolo won the race in a bunch sprint before Fernando Gaviria and Daniele Bennati.

Teams
Nineteen teams started the race. Each team had a maximum of eight riders:

Result

References

2016 UCI Europe Tour
2016 in Italian sport
Giro del Piemonte